Lorenzo "Rimp" Lanier (born October 19, 1948) is an American former professional baseball player. An outfielder and third baseman, Lanier had a September trial with the  Pittsburgh Pirates of Major League Baseball. He appeared in six games, five as a pinch hitter and one as a pinch runner, with five plate appearances, no hits and no runs scored. He reached base once when he was hit by a pitch thrown by Gary Gentry of the New York Mets on September 17. Lanier was not on the postseason roster as the Pirates went on to win the National League pennant and the 1971 World Series.

He played for seven seasons (1967–73) in the Pirates' farm system, batting .289 with 608 hits in 633 minor league games.

References

External links

1948 births
Living people
Sportspeople from Tuskegee, Alabama
Baseball players from Alabama
Baseball players from Cleveland
Charleston Charlies players
Clinton Pirates players
Columbus Jets players
Pittsburgh Pirates players
Salem Rebels players
Sherbrooke Pirates players
York Pirates players
African-American baseball players